Parliamentary elections were held in Mauritania on 9 May 1965. Following the merger of all the country's political parties into the Mauritanian People's Party (PPM), the country had become a one-party state in December 1961. As such, the PPM was the only party to contest the election, and won all 40 seats in the National Assembly. Voter turnout was 92.8%.

Results

References

Mauritania
1965 in Mauritania
Elections in Mauritania
One-party elections
May 1965 events in Africa